Gilmour is a surname of Scottish or Irish origin, derived from an anglicisation of the Gaelic name Mac Gille Mhoire (meaning "Son of the Follower of the Virgin Mary"), the same origin as the name McLemore.  Notable people with this surname include:

Alan Gilmour, Scottish/Australian playwright and librettist
Andrew Gilmour (cricketer)
Bill Gilmour (disambiguation), various, including:
Bill Gilmour (director) (born 1939), Scottish television director
Bill Gilmour (politician) (born 1942), Canadian politician
Billy Gilmour (ice hockey) (1885–1959), Canadian ice hockey player
Billy Gilmour (born 2001), Scottish footballer
Clyde Gilmour (1912–1997), Canadian broadcaster and print journalist
David Gilmour (disambiguation), various, including:
Dave Gilmour (ice hockey, born 1881) (1881–1932), Canadian hockey player (Ottawa Silver Seven)
Dave Gilmour (ice hockey, born 1950), major league ice hockey player (Calgary Cowboys)
David Gilmour (writer), Canadian writer and television journalist
David Gilmour, English guitarist and member of Pink Floyd
Sir David Gilmour, 4th Baronet
Dean Gilmour, Canadian dramatist
Doug Gilmour (born 1963), Canadian ice hockey player
Ginger Gilmour, American artist, model and sculptor
Graham Gilmour, (1885–1912) was a British pioneer aviator.
Ian Gilmour, Baron Gilmour of Craigmillar (1926–2007), British politician
James Gilmour (disambiguation), various
John Gilmour (disambiguation), various, including:
 Sir John Gilmour of Craigmillar (1605–1671), Lord President of the Court of Session 1661–1671 
 Sir John Gilmour, 1st Baronet (1845–1920), Scottish Unionist politician
 Sir John Gilmour, 2nd Baronet (1876–1940), Scottish Unionist politician, Home Secretary, Secretary of State for Scotland
 Sir John Gilmour, 3rd Baronet (1912–2007), Scottish Conservative Party politician, Member of Parliament for East Fife 1961–1979
John Gilmour (ice hockey), (born 1993), Canadian ice hockey player
Lee Gilmour (born 1978), English former professional rugby league footballer
Leon Gilmour (1907–1996), American printmaker
 Léonie Gilmour (1873–1933), American educator, editor, and journalist.
 Raymond Gilmour (born 1959), Northern Irish republican paramilitary who later became a double agent, reporting to British security
 Robert Gilmour Leckie (1833–1914), Canadian mining engineer

See also
Gillmor
Gilmor
Gilmore (surname)
Gilmour (disambiguation)

English-language surnames